Kim Cooper (born 26 October 1965 in Parramatta) is an Australian former softball player who won a bronze medal at the 1996 Summer Olympics.

References

External links
 
 
 

1965 births
Living people
Australian softball players
Olympic softball players of Australia
Olympic bronze medalists for Australia
Olympic medalists in softball
Softball players at the 1996 Summer Olympics
Medalists at the 1996 Summer Olympics
People from Parramatta
Sportswomen from New South Wales
Sportspeople from Sydney
20th-century Australian women